Murray Cardiff (10 June 1934 – 31 October 2013) was a Progressive Conservative party member of the House of Commons of Canada. He was born in Grey Township, Ontario and was a farmer by career.

He represented the Ontario riding of Huron—Bruce where he was first elected in the 1980 federal election. He won re-election in the 1984 and 1988 federal elections, therefore becoming a member in the 32nd, 33rd and 34th Canadian Parliaments.

Cardiff left federal politics after his defeat in the 1993 federal election to Paul Steckle of the Liberal party. He died in hospital at Listowel, Ontario on 31 October 2013.

He is the grandson of former member of parliament Elston Cardiff, who represented Huron-North and later Huron.

Electoral record (partial)

References

External links
 

1934 births
2013 deaths
Members of the House of Commons of Canada from Ontario
People from Huron County, Ontario
Progressive Conservative Party of Canada MPs